The Moldovița (in its upper course also: Roșoșa) is a left tributary of the river Moldova in Romania. It discharges into the Moldova in Vama. It flows through the villages Argel, Rașca, Moldovița, Vatra Moldoviței, Frumosu, Strâmtura and Vama.

Tributaries

The following rivers are tributaries to the river Moldovița:

Left: Dubu, Rașcova (Rașca), Săcrieș, Ciumârna, Lupoaia, Dragoșa, Frumosul
Right: Argel, Lunguleț, Demăcușa, Vulcan, Pârâul Boului, Deia

References

External links
 

Rivers of Romania
Rivers of Suceava County